Museumsquartier (formerly Mariahilfer Straße until 1991 and Babenbergerstraße from 1991 until 2000) is a station on  of the Vienna U-Bahn. It is located in the Innere Stadt District. It opened in 1980, using the structure of a pre-metro station opened in 1966 in the same location.

The station is expected to close temporarily from 2020 until 2022 to install platform screen doors in preparation for the transfer of this segment of U2 to the new driverless U5, which will take place between 2025 and 2027.

References

External links 
 

Buildings and structures in Innere Stadt
Railway stations opened in 1980
Vienna U-Bahn stations
1980 establishments in Austria
Railway stations in Austria opened in the 20th century